Terebra mariesi is a species of sea snail, a marine gastropod mollusc in the family Terebridae, the auger snails.

Description

Distribution

References

 Smith, E. A. 1880. Descriptions of twelve new species of shells. Proceedings of the Zoological Society of London 1880:478-485, pl. 48.
 Bratcher T. & Cernohorsky W.O. (1987). Living terebras of the world. A monograph of the recent Terebridae of the world. American Malacologists, Melbourne, Florida & Burlington, Massachusetts. 240pp.

External links
 Fedosov, A. E.; Malcolm, G.; Terryn, Y.; Gorson, J.; Modica, M. V.; Holford, M.; Puillandre, N. (2020). Phylogenetic classification of the family Terebridae (Neogastropoda: Conoidea). Journal of Molluscan Studies

Terebridae
Gastropods described in 1880